Berit Lindholm (born Berit Maria Jonsson, 18 October 1934) is a Swedish soprano.

Born in Stockholm, Lindholm studied at the opera school in that city before making her debut at the Royal Swedish Opera in 1963. She sang at the Royal Opera House as Chrysothemis in 1966, returning for Isolde, Brünnhilde, and Chrysothemis again between 1973 and 1975. Brünnhilde was the role of her Bayreuth Festival debut in 1968 and her debut at the Metropolitan Opera in 1975; along with Isolde it was one of her most notable roles. In 1969 she sang Cassandre in Berlioz's Les Troyens, conducted by Colin Davis.

References

External links
 

1934 births
Living people
Swedish operatic sopranos
Singers from Stockholm
20th-century Swedish women  opera singers